Baillieston (Ward 20) is one of the 23 wards of Glasgow City Council. On its creation in 2007 and in 2012 it returned four council members, using the single transferable vote system. For the 2017 Glasgow City Council election, the boundaries were changed: the ward decreased in size and population, and returned three members.

Boundaries
Located in the far east of Glasgow, the core of the ward since 2007 includes Baillieston as well as Barrachnie, Garrowhill, Springhill, Swinton, Wellhouse, Easthall, Daldowie and Broomhouse with the northern boundary being the M8 motorway) and the eastern and southern limits being the city borders with North Lanarkshire and South Lanarkshire.

The 2017 changes saw the neighbourhoods of Barlanark, Budhill, Greenfield, Lightburn and Springboig removed and assigned to the East Centre ward.

Councillors

Election results

2022 election

2021 by-election
Labour councillor Jim Coleman was disqualified on 28 January 2021 after failing to attend council meetings for six months. A by-election for the seat was held 18 March 2021. SNP candidate and former ward councillor David Turner won the seat.

2017 election

2012 election

November 2008 by-election
On 6 November 2008, a by-election was held following the death of Labour councillor David Hay on 27 September 2008. The by-election was won by Labour's Andy Muir.

September 2008 by-election
On 18 September 2008, a by-election was held following the election of John Mason as an MP for Glasgow East on 25 July 2008. The by-election was won by the SNP's David Turner.

2007 election

See also
Wards of Glasgow

References

External links
Listed Buildings in Baillieston Ward, North Lanarkshire (sic) at British Listed Buildings

Wards of Glasgow
Baillieston